Brown sugar is a sucrose sugar product with a distinctive brown color due to the presence of molasses. It is by tradition an unrefined or partially refined soft sugar consisting of sugar crystals with some residual molasses content (natural brown sugar), but now often produced by the addition of molasses to refined white sugar (commercial brown sugar).

The Codex Alimentarius requires brown sugar to contain at least 88% of sucrose plus invert sugar. Commercial brown sugar contains from 3.5% molasses (light brown sugar) to 6.5% molasses (dark brown sugar) based on total volume. Based on total weight, regular commercial brown sugar contains up to 10% molasses. The product is naturally moist from the hygroscopic nature of the molasses and is often labeled "soft." The product may undergo processing to give a product that flows better for industrial handling. The addition of dyes or other chemicals may be permitted in some areas or for industrial products.

Particle size is variable but generally smaller than granulated white sugar. Products for industrial use (e.g., the industrial production of cakes) may be based on caster sugar, which has crystals of approximately 0.35mm.

History

In the late 19th century, the newly consolidated refined white sugar industry, which did not have full control over brown sugar production, mounted a smear campaign against brown sugar, reproducing microscopic photographs of harmless but repulsive-looking microbes living in brown sugar. The effort was so successful that by 1900, a best-selling cookbook warned that brown sugar was of inferior quality and was susceptible to infestation by "a minute insect". This campaign of disinformation was also felt in other sectors using raw or brown sugar such as brewing;

Production

Brown sugar is often produced by adding sugarcane molasses to completely refined white sugar crystals to more carefully control the ratio of molasses to sugar crystals and to reduce manufacturing costs. Brown sugar prepared in this manner is often much coarser than its unrefined equivalent and its molasses may be easily separated from the crystals by simply washing to reveal the underlying white sugar crystals; in contrast, with unrefined brown sugar, washing will reveal underlying crystals which are off-white due to the inclusion of molasses.

The molasses usually used for food is obtained from sugar cane, because the flavor is generally preferred over beet sugar molasses, although in some areas, especially in Belgium and the Netherlands, sugar beet molasses is used. The white sugar used can be from either beet or cane, as the chemical composition, nutritional value, color, and taste of fully refined white sugar is for practical purposes the same, no matter from what plant it originates. Even with less-than-perfect refining, the small differences in color, odor, and taste of the white sugar will be masked by the molasses.

Natural brown sugar

Natural brown sugar, raw sugar or whole cane sugar is sugar that retains some amount of the molasses from the mother liquor (the partially evaporated sugar cane juice). Based upon weight, brown cane sugar when fully refined yields up to 70% white sugar, the degree depending on how much molasses remained in the sugar crystals, which in turn is dependent upon whether the brown sugar was centrifuged or not. As there is more molasses in natural brown sugar, it contains minor nutritional value and mineral content. Some natural brown sugars have particular names and characteristics, and are sold as turbinado, demerara or raw sugar if they have been centrifuged to a large degree. Brown sugars that have been only mildly centrifuged or unrefined (non-centrifuged) retain a much higher degree of molasses and are called various names across the globe according to their country of origin: e.g. panela, rapadura, jaggery, muscovado, piloncillo, etc.

Although brown sugar has been touted as having health benefits ranging from soothing menstrual cramps to serving as an anti-aging skin treatment, there is no nutritional basis to support brown sugar as a healthier alternative to refined sugars despite the negligible amounts of minerals in brown sugar not found in white sugar.

Turbinado, demerara and "raw" sugars are made from crystallized, partially evaporated sugar cane juice and spun in a centrifuge to remove almost all of the molasses. The sugar crystals are large and golden-coloured. This sugar can be sold as is or sent to the refinery to produce white sugar.

Muscovado, panela, piloncillo, chancaca, jaggery and other natural dark brown sugars have been minimally centrifuged or not at all. Typically these sugars are made in smaller factories or "cottage industries" in developing nations, where they are produced with traditional practices that do not make use of industrialized vacuum evaporators or centrifuges. They are commonly boiled in open pans upon wood-fired stoves until the sugar cane juice reaches approximately 30% of the former volume and sucrose crystallization begins. They are then poured into molds to solidify or onto cooling pans where they are beaten or worked vigorously to produce a granulated brown sugar. In some countries, such as Mauritius or the Philippines, a natural brown sugar called muscovado is produced by partially centrifuging the evaporated and crystallizing cane juice to create a sugar-crystal rich mush, which is allowed to drain under gravity to produce varying degrees of molasses content in the final product. This process approximates a slightly modernized practice introduced in the 19th century to generate a better quality of natural brown sugar. 

A similar Japanese version of uncentrifuged natural cane sugar is called kokuto ( kokutō). This is a regional specialty of Okinawa and is often sold in the form of large lumps. It is sometimes used to make shochu. Okinawan brown sugar is sometimes referred to as 'black sugar' for its darker colour compared to other types of unrefined sugar, although when broken up into smaller pieces its colour becomes lighter. Kokuto is commonly used as a flavouring for drinks and desserts, but can also be eaten raw as it has a taste similar to caramel. The sugar is also thought to be rich in nutrients removed during the refinement process of other sugars, such as potassium and iron.

Culinary considerations
Brown sugar adds flavor to desserts and baked goods. It can be substituted for maple sugar, and maple sugar can be substituted for it in recipes. Brown sugar caramelizes much more readily than refined sugar, and this effect can be used to make glazes and gravies brown while cooking.

For domestic purposes one can create the equivalent of brown sugar by mixing white sugar with molasses. Suitable proportions are about one tablespoon of molasses to each cup of sugar (one-sixteenth of the total volume). Molasses comprises 10% of brown sugar's total weight, which is about one ninth of the white sugar weight. Due to varying qualities and colors of molasses products, for lighter or darker sugar, reduce or increase its proportion according to taste.

In following a modern recipe that specifies "brown sugar", one usually may assume that the intended meaning is light brown sugar, but which one prefers is largely a matter of taste. Even in recipes such as cakes, where the moisture content might be critical, the amount of water involved is too small to matter. More importantly, adding dark brown sugar or molasses will impart a stronger flavor, with more of a suggestion of caramel.

Brown sugar that has hardened can be made soft again by adding a new source of moisture for the molasses, or by heating and remelting the molasses. Storing brown sugar in a freezer will prevent moisture from escaping and molasses from crystallizing, allowing for a much longer shelf life.

Nutritional value

One hundred grams of brown sugar contains 377 Calories (nutrition table), as opposed to 387 Calories in white sugar (link to nutrition table). However, brown sugar packs more densely than white sugar due to the smaller crystal size and may have more calories when measured by volume.

Any minerals present in brown sugar come from the molasses added to the white sugar. In a 100-gram reference amount, brown sugar contains 15% of the Daily Value for iron, with no other vitamins or minerals in significant content (table).

See also

 Caramelization
 Peen tong – a Chinese brown sugar and candy
Sugar industry

References

Sugars
Molasses